Leonard Charles "Lee" Curreri (born January 4, 1961) is an American actor and musician, most known for his work in the film, Fame (1980) and its television spinoff, Fame (1982–1987).

Life and work
Curreri was born in New York City, in the Bronx, and attended high school at Fordham Preparatory School. He also attended the Manhattan School of Music.

Curreri played the role of Bruno Martelli, the keyboard maven, in the film Fame and also in its spinoff TV series, also called Fame. He obtained the role in the movie after auditioning in New York City. He has also appeared on an episode of The New Love American Style.

He played piano with In Vitro, and the Iona College Singers. He is a songwriter and has worked with a number of performers, including Natalie Cole and Phil Perry. In December 2008, he appeared on Channel 4's Bring Back... series when Justin Lee Colins managed to get some of the original television series cast members together. He released a CD, Aquabox, which has a booklet on the inside containing pictures of one of Curreri's sons, Joey, shortly before his son was born (a pre-birth picture contained in the leaflet).

Partial filmography 

 Fame (1980) - Bruno
 Crystal Heart (1986) - Christopher Newley

Soundtracks 

 The Deep and Dreamless Sleep (2006) – with Peter Freeman and Jeff Rona

See also 
 The Kids from "Fame"

References

External links 

Official website

American male film actors
American male television actors
American people of Italian descent
1961 births
Living people
Male actors from New York City
Entertainers from the Bronx
20th-century American pianists
American male pianists
21st-century American pianists
20th-century American male musicians
21st-century American male musicians
Fordham Preparatory School alumni